West Central is a constituency represented on the London Assembly. The seat is currently held by Tony Devenish, a Conservative.

It covers the combined area of the City of Westminster, the London Borough of Hammersmith and Fulham and the Royal Borough of Kensington and Chelsea.

History

Since the seat's creation in 2000, the elected Assembly Member (AM) has always been a Conservative candidate: three have represented the seat in succession. Its first AM was Angie Bray, who subsequently served as MP for Ealing Central and Acton. She was followed by Kit Malthouse in 2008, who was elected as MP for North West Hampshire in 2015, thus acting as an AM and MP for the remainder of his term on the London Assembly. He was succeeded in 2016 by Tony Devenish, who has been a councillor for Knightsbridge and Belgravia in Westminster (part of the GLA seat) since 2006.

At the time of the 2016 London Assembly elections, two of the MPs for the five parliamentary constituencies covered by this seat were members of the Labour Party, and the other three from the Conservatives; Labour have always been the main challenger in the corresponding GLA seat. It includes a number of affluent areas which have tended to vote for Conservative candidates in local and general elections, accounting for the results to date.

After the 2016 election, defeated candidate Mandy Richards lodged an election petition claiming that the results showed a discrepancy in turnout and that 15,000–20,000 postal votes were missing. The case was heard on 8 and 9 December 2016, with the result being all aspects of the petition were dismissed.

Assembly members

Mayoral election results 
Below are the results for the candidate which received the highest share of the popular vote in the constituency at each mayoral election.

Overlapping constituencies
The West Central Assembly constituency comprises all of the following UK Parliament constituencies:

Chelsea and Fulham (Conservative)
Hammersmith (Labour)
Kensington (Conservative)
Westminster North (Labour)

It also includes parts of the following constituencies:
Cities of London and Westminster (Conservative)

Assembly election results

2020s

2010s

References

London Assembly constituencies
Politics of the City of Westminster
Politics of the Royal Borough of Kensington and Chelsea
Politics of the London Borough of Hammersmith and Fulham
2000 establishments in England
Constituencies established in 2000